The Flyers Cup is an annual high school ice hockey tournament held by the Philadelphia Flyers. The first Flyers Cup was organized by the Flyers' Hockey Central organization in 1980, sponsored by the Pepsi Cola Bottlers of the Delaware Valley. It was held at the University of Pennsylvania's Class of '23 Rink until relocating to the Haverford Skatium in 1984.

The Flyers Cup was the idea of Ed Golden, then Public Relations Director for The Spectrum, who suggested the concept of a regional high school hockey championship in the fall of 1979 to Aaron Siegel and Andy Abramson, who is considered the father of the Flyers Cup. The Flyers Cup logo was designed by Sal Panasci, husband of the Flyers Marketing Director at the time, Linda Panasci, and donated by his design firm. 

The founding organizers of the Flyers Cup included Aaron Siegel, President of The Spectrum, Andy Abramson, Executive Director/Flyers Hockey Central, Kenneth R. Gesner, Atlantic District President and USA Hockey Director, Jack Hunt, President, InterCounty Scholastic Hockey League, Andy Richards, President, Suburban High School Hockey League, Paul Saylor, Commissioner, Lower Bucks County Scholastic Hockey League and Jim Cunningham, President, Lower Bucks County Scholastic Hockey League. Archbishop Carroll's Scott Chamness was named the first recipient of the Bobby Clarke Award as the 1980s Flyers Cup's Most Valuable Player. 

The invitational tournament is the scholastic hockey championship for eastern Pennsylvania high schools and is conducted through three tiers of play, AAA, AA, and A with AAA representing private schools, AA large public schools and A small public schools based on male student enrollment. There are 53 participating teams consisting of 13 AAA, 20 AA, and 20 A chosen  from teams participating in the following leagues: the Eastern High School Hockey League, the Inter-County Scholastic Hockey League, the Lehigh Valley Scholastic Hockey League, the Lower Bucks County Scholastic Hockey League, the South Jersey High School Ice Hockey League, the Suburban High School Hockey League, and the Central Pennsylvania Ice Hockey League. Teams are invited to participate based on their skill level as demonstrated by the strength of their overall schedule and season performance. The winner of the Flyers Cup at each tier level plays the respective western champion as determined by the Penguins Cup, held by the Pittsburgh Penguins, for the  Pennsylvania State High School Ice Hockey Championship. 

The Pennsylvania Cup came about through the collaboration of USA Hockey Director for Mid-America, Frank Black and the Flyers/Hockey Central's Andy Abramson, with support from Flyers President Bob Butera and then Penguins CEO Paul Martha. The first Pennsylvania Cup was held in 1981 in Philadelphia at the University of Pennsylvania's Class of '23 Ice Rink and hosted by The Philadelphia Flyers. The game featured the winner of the Flyers Cup vs. the winner of the Penguins Cup, a tournament that was inaugurated in 1981.

Champions

The following teams have won the AAA Level Flyers Cup:  

2021: Malvern Prep
2019: La Salle College High School
2018: Saint Joseph's High School
2017: Holy Ghost Prep
2016: La Salle College High School
2015: Holy Ghost Prep
2014: La Salle College High School
2013: La Salle College High School
2012: La Salle College High School
2011: La Salle College High School
2010: Cardinal O'Hara High School
2009: La Salle College High School
2008: La Salle College High School
2007: Holy Ghost Prep
2006: Cardinal O'Hara High School
2005: Malvern Prep
2004: Malvern Prep
2003: Malvern Prep
2002: Malvern Prep
2001: Malvern Prep
2000:  Father Judge
1999:  Conwell Egan
1998: La Salle College High School
1997: Malvern Prep
1996: La Salle College High School
1995: Germantown Academy
1994: Germantown Academy
1993:  Monsignor Bonner
1992:  Monsignor Bonner
1991: Council Rock
1990: Malvern Prep
1989: William Tennent High School
1988: Council Rock
1987: Malvern Prep
1986: Conestoga
1985: Cherry Hill East
1984:  Archbishop Ryan
1983: Germantown Academy
1982: Germantown Academy
1981:  Archbishop Carroll
1980:  Archbishop Carroll

The following teams have won the AA Level Flyers Cup:

2021: TBD - TBD
2020: CANCELLED - (COVID19 PANDEMIC)
2019: ICSHL - Downingtown East High School Cougars 
2018: ICSHL - Downingtown East High School Cougars
2017: ICSHL - Downingtown East High School Cougars
2016: SHSHL - Central Bucks South High School Titans
2015: ICSHL - Downingtown East High School Cougars
2014: SHSHL - Central Bucks South  High School Titans
2013: SHSHL - Cherokee Chiefs
2012: SHSHL - Council Rock High School South Golden Hawks
2011: SHSHL - Council Rock High School South Golden Hawks
2010: ICSHL - Downingtown East High School Cougars
2009: SHSHL - Council Rock High School South Golden Hawks
2008: ICSHL - Conestoga   High School Pioneers
2007: EHSHL - Haverford High School Fords
2006: EHSHL - Haverford High School Fords
2005: EHSHL - Haverford High School Fords
2004: ICSHL - Archbishop John Carroll High School Patriots
2003: LBCSHL - Holy Ghost Prep Firebirds
2002: ICSHL - Archbishop John Carroll High School Patriots
2001: ICSHL - Archbishop John Carroll High School Patriots
2000: ICSHL - Archbishop John Carroll High School Patriots
1999: ICSHL - LaSalle College High School Explorers
1998: ICSHL - Unionville   High School Indians
1997: ICSHL - Conestoga   High School Pioneers
1996: EHSHL - Upper Darby   High School Royals
1995: LBCSHL - Conwell Egan   High School Eagles
1994: LBCSHL - Conwell Egan   High School Eagles
1993: LBCSHL - Father Judge   High School Crusaders
1992: SHSHL - Council Rock   High School North Indians
1991: SHSHL - Germantown Academy Patriots
1990: LBCSHL - Father Judge   High School Crusaders
1989: 
1988: 
1987: 
1986: 
1985: 
1984: 
1983: 
1982: 
1981: 
1980:

The following teams have won the A Level Flyers Cup:

2021: TBD - TBD
2020: CANCELLED - (COVID19 PANDEMIC)
2019: ICSHL - Bayard Rustin High School Golden Knights
2018: ICSHL - Bayard Rustin   High School Golden Knights
2017: ICSHL - Bayard Rustin   High School Golden Knights
2016: ICSHL - Bayard Rustin   High School Golden Knights
2015: ICSHL - Bayard Rustin   High School Golden Knights
2014: ICSHL - Bayard Rustin   High School Golden Knights
2013: ICSHL - West Chester East Vikings
2012: ICSHL - Bayard Rustin   High School Golden Knights
2011: ICSHL - Springfield Cougars
2010: ICSHL - Bayard Rustin   High School Golden Knights
2009: ICSHL - Bayard Rustin   High School Golden Knights
2008: ICSHL - West Chester East High School Vikings
2007: ICSHL - West Chester Henderson  High School Warriors
2006: ICSHL - Penncrest High School Lions
2005: ICSHL - Penncrest  High School Lions
2004: ICSHL - Radnor High School 
2003: ICSHL - Radnor High School 
2002: ICSHL - Radnor High School 
2001: EHSHL - Springfield  High School Cougars
2000: LBCSHL - Pennsbury  High School Falcons
1999: LBCSHL - Archbishop Ryan  High School Raiders
1998: ICSHL - Garnet Valley  High School Pioneers
1997: EHSHL - Marple-Newtown  High School Tigers
1996: ICSHL - St Pius X High School 
1995: ICSHL - Unionville  High School Indians
1994: SJHSHL - Washington Twp High School 
1993: LBCSHL - Pennsbury  High School Falcons
1992: EHSHL - Haverford  High School Fords
1991: EHSHL - Monsignor Bonner  High School Friars
1990: 
1989: 
1988: 
1987: 
1986: 
1985: 
1984: 
1983: 
1982: 
1981: 
1980:

See also 
 Pennsylvania high school hockey

External links
Flyers Cup website (on www.icshl.org)
 Flyers Cup Awards (on www.icshl.org)
 Philadelphia Flyers Fan Development website
 Eastern Pennsylvania High School Hockey Rankings (on United States High School Hockey Online website
Flyers Cup History from 1980-1999 (on PA Hockey History website)

High school ice hockey in the United States
High school sports in Pennsylvania
Ice hockey in Pennsylvania
American ice hockey trophies and awards
Philadelphia Flyers
Ice hockey in Philadelphia